Decacovirus is a subgenus of viruses in the genus Alphacoronavirus.

Species
The genus consists of the following two species:

 Bat coronavirus HKU10
 Rhinolophus ferrumequinum alphacoronavirus HuB-2013

References

Virus subgenera
Alphacoronaviruses